Elepaio is a bimonthly peer-reviewed scientific journal published by the Hawaii Audubon Society (the Hawaii chapter of the National Audubon Society). It is named after a small Hawaiian bird. The journal was established in 1939.

See also
List of ornithology journals

External links

References

Journals and magazines relating to birding and ornithology
Publications established in 1939
English-language journals
Audubon movement
1939 establishments in Hawaii
Bimonthly journals